Avtozavodsky (masculine), Avtozavodskaya (feminine), or Avtozavodskoye (neuter) may refer to:
Avtozavodsky City District, name of several city districts in Russia
Avtozavodsky Bridge, a bridge in Moscow, Russia

Metro lines
Aŭtazavodskaja line, a line of the Minsk Metro, Minsk, Belarus
Avtozavodskaya line (Nizhny Novgorod Metro), a line of the Nizhny Novgorod Metro, Nizhny Novgorod, Russia

Metro stations
Avtozavodskaya (Zamoskvoretskaya line), a station of the Moscow Metro, Moscow, Russia
Avtozavodskaya (Moscow Central Circle), a station of the Moscow Ring Railway, Russia
Aŭtazavodskaja (Minsk Metro), a station of the Avtozavodskaya Line of the Minsk Metro, Minsk, Belarus
Avtozavodskaya (Nizhny Novgorod Metro), a station of the Nizhny Novgorod Metro, Nizhny Novgorod, Russia